The 3rd Assembly District of Wisconsin is one of 99 districts in the Wisconsin State Assembly. Located in northeast Wisconsin, the district comprises most of the north half of Calumet County, and parts of southeast Outagamie County and northwest Manitowoc County.  It includes the city of Brillion and parts of the cities of Appleton and Menasha, as well as the villages of Combined Locks, Kimberly, Hilbert, Potter, and Sherwood. The district is represented by Republican Ron Tusler, since January 2017.

The 3rd Assembly district is located within Wisconsin's 1st Senate district, along with the 1st and 2nd Assembly districts.

History
The district was created in the 1972 redistricting act (1971 Wisc. Act 304) which first established the numbered district system, replacing the previous system which allocated districts to specific counties.  The 3rd district was drawn mostly in line with the previous Manitowoc County 2nd district, but exchanged towns in southern Manitowoc for towns in southeastern Brown County, which previously made up the southern half of the Brown County 2nd district.  The last representative of the Manitowoc 2nd district, Everett E. Bolle, went on to win the first election to represent the 3rd Assembly district.

The boundaries of the 3rd district have changed significantly over the various redistricting laws passed since 1972.  The 1982 court-ordered redistricting, which completely scrambled State Assembly districts, moved the 3rd district to southeast Milwaukee County for the 1983–1984 session. The 1983 redistricting act restored the district closer to its previous location, but located it almost entirely in Calumet County.  The 1992 court-ordered redistricting added more of southern Brown County and northern Fond du Lac County to the district and removed areas of southeastern Outagamie County.  The 2002 court-ordered redistricting plan removed towns of Fond du Lac and southern Calumet, and added back areas of southeastern Outagamie County.  The district only changed slightly in the 2011 redistricting act (2011 Wisc. Act 43), removing the remaining towns of Brown County from the district.  The 2022 court-ordered redistricting shifted the district further west, adding part of Manitowoc County and shedding towns along the east shore of Lake Winnebago.

List of past representatives

References 
en.wikipedia.org/wiki/Ron_Tusler

Wisconsin State Assembly districts
Calumet County, Wisconsin
Outagamie County, Wisconsin